Mârșani is a commune in Dolj County, Oltenia, Romania with a population of 5,195 people. It is composed of a single village, Mârșani.

References

Communes in Dolj County
Localities in Oltenia